Dún Dúchathair or simply Dúchathair (anglicized Doocaher), meaning "black fort", is a large stone fort on the cliffs at Cill Éinne, (Killeany), Inishmore (one of the Aran Islands) in County Galway, Ireland. Due to erosion, it now sits on a rocky promontory that stretches out into the sea. On its outer side there are large walls, reaching 6 metres high and 5 metres wide. On the inside are the ruins of clocháns. There is also evidence of a cheval de frise protecting the entrance.

Its age is unknown.

References

Forts in the Republic of Ireland
Archaeological sites in County Galway
Aran Islands
Bronze Age Ireland
National Monuments in County Galway